John Henry Reardon (born July 30, 1975) is a Canadian actor and former university football player. Prior to 2015, Reardon starred as Blake Laviolette on the CBC Television series Arctic Air and had a recurring role as Greg Cameron on the Showcase series Continuum.  As of 2019, Reardon stars as Detective Charlie Hudson on the Canadian television series Hudson & Rex.

Life and career
Born July 30, 1975, in Halifax, Nova Scotia, Reardon studied Theartre arts at the Lir Academy of Dramatic Arts in Dublin, Ireland as well as improv at The Second City in Los Angeles, California, and Toronto, Ontario. While at Mount Allison University, Reardon considered pursuing a career in medicine, but growing up, his dream was to become a professional athlete. He was a Canadian all-star college football player for Mount Allison from 1993 to 1997, graduating with a B.S. degree in Biology.

He started acting in 2001 and has appeared in several TV shows and movies, such as Tru Calling as Randall Thompson, White Chicks as Heath, Scary Movie 4 as Jeremiah and Merlin's Apprentice as Jack.  Starting in 2013, he has roles on both  CBC's Arctic Air and Showcase's Continuum.

On Arctic Air, John Reardon portrayed Blake Laviolette, a young, good-looking "Top Gun-type" pilot who was secretly involved with his coworker and fellow pilot Krista Ivarson.  According to Reardon, his character is "a fascinating duality because Blake is a bit of a cocky hotshot pilot who, I think, just found himself in the north and Yellowknife as a bit of a stepping stone to moving to what he probably considered his dream job. However, once he gets there, he starts to realize that there’s something about that part of the country that gets to people. In fact, it starts to get to him and he begins to fall in love with the north, followed by Krista (Pascale Hutton). The priorities he had before all this end up changing and Blake becomes almost a prouder Yellowknifer than anyone else."

On Continuum, Reardon plays Greg Cameron, the husband of the main character, Kiera Cameron.  According to Reardon, "Greg on the surface appears to be a clean-cut family man who is a respectable law-abiding member of society. The memory of Greg, along with their son Sam, is an anchor for Kiera when she is transported back in time and taken away from her family. However, as season one progresses, it appears that Greg may not be what he seems."

In 2019, Reardon first appeared on the Canadian hit series Hudson & Rex as recently-divorced Charlie Hudson, a detective for St. John's Police Department. His sidekick and fellow member of the SJPD is a K-9 dog named Rex who had lost his human partner in a case they were working. Charlie was the only one at the scene that was able to get Rex to step away from his partner's body, and the two formed an unbreakable bond as they began to work cases together. He has revealed his take on the pair's chemistry and why Charlie and Rex get along so well, "Charlie, he’s looking for some companionship since he’s on his own. Rex fills that void for him and they work really well together." Reardon has reprised his role as Charlie for an additional three seasons after the first season was a huge success. Following the finale of season 4, the hit show has since been renewed for season 5, set to premier in Fall 2022.

Personal life
In 2008, Reardon married actress Meghan Ory. They had previously worked together on the miniseries Merlin's Apprentice. Their first child was born in 2018, and their second in 2019.

Filmography

Film

Television

References

External links 
 

1975 births
Living people
Alumni of RADA
Canadian male film actors
Canadian male television actors
Male actors from Halifax, Nova Scotia
Mount Allison Mounties football players
Players of Canadian football from Nova Scotia
Sportspeople from Halifax, Nova Scotia
21st-century Canadian male actors